La Pointe du Chay is a limestone promontory, about 5 kilometres from La Rochelle, France, between the seafront of Aytré and Angoulins.

La Pointe du Chay is composed of layers of limestone dating back to the Sequanian stage (upper Oxfordian stage) of the Jurassic period (circa 160 million years ago), when a large part of France was submerged. These rocks were formed by the accumulation of organisms falling on the seabed, where they solidified. This happened at the time dinosaurs were roaming the earth.

Many of these layers are especially visible and easily accessible at La Pointe du Chay, in which are encapsulated many small marine fossils. Layers of thick white rocks, formed during period of relatively warm seas, alternate with highly friable layers containing sands and remains of mud, formed during colder periods, and with layers containing various corals, that were formed during warmer, tropical times.

Homonym
There is another Pointe du Chay in Royan, also in Charente-Maritime.

Notes

Headlands of France
Landforms of Charente-Maritime